Winchester Castle F.C. are an English football team based in Winchester. The club is affiliated to the Hampshire Football Association.

History
The club was first formed in the 1960s  and originally played in the Winchester and North Hants Leagues. The club gained entry to Division Four of the Hampshire League for the start of the 1971–72 campaign, finishing third in their first season, and gaining promotion to Division Three. The club remained in Division Three until the end of the 1983–84 campaign when they gained promotion to Division Two as champions.

The club remained in Division Two for two seasons and was then promoted to Division One, when many teams from the Hampshire league left to join the newly formed Wessex Football League. However, after two seasons in Division One the club finished bottom and was relegated back to Division Two. Further relegation followed at the end of the 1991–92 campaign when the club finished second from bottom of Division Two. The club bounced back up at the end of the 1996–97 campaign when they finished as runners-up in Division Three.

In March 2001 it was announced that the club would merge with their local rivals Winchester City in an attempt to create one of the most powerful non-league sides in Hampshire. The amalgamated club decided that it would use Winchester City's Abbots Barton for the first team, and keep Winchester Castle's ground for the reserve and ladies team. At the end of the 2000–01 season Winchester Castle finished as runners-up behind Winchester City. The clubs then formally merged in June of that year.

The club was reformed in 2006, when the Winchester City 'A' team  and 'B' team decided to leave their parent club, to keep playing together as the Hampshire League 2004 did not want reserve teams to feature amongst its members any more. The following season the club became one of the founder members of the Hampshire Premier League.

Ground

Winchester Castle play their home games at Hampshire County Council Sports Ground, A31 Petersfield Road, Chilcomb, Winchester, Hampshire, SO21 1HU.

Honours
Hampshire League Division Two:
 Runners-up (1): 2000–01
Hampshire League Division Three:
 Champions (1): 1983–84
 Runners-up (1): 1996–97
Hampshire Football Association Intermediate Cup
 Winners (1): 1976-77

Records

 Highest League Position: 4th in Hampshire Premier League 2013–14

References

External links
 

Football clubs in Hampshire
Association football clubs established in 2006
Sport in Winchester
2006 establishments in England
Football clubs in England
North Hants League
Hampshire League
Wessex Football League
Hampshire League 2004
Hampshire Premier League